The Lycée François-Ier, in long form Lycée International François-Ier, is a public secondary school located in Fontainebleau, France. In addition to the mainstream public French curriculum, the institution houses private English and German-language sections through which students can take the option internationale du baccalauréat (OIB), the international variant of the French baccalauréat.

History
Plans to establish a municipal school in Fontainebleau were first tabled in 1874 under president Patrice de MacMahon and minister of public instruction Arthur de Cumont, the objective being to provide education for the sons of officers. After a competition was held in 1877, Henri Proust was officially commissioned in 1880 to design the new institution, which was founded at the site of a house Le Clos de Bel-Air (originally built in 1840) and would fall under the category of lycée.

The school was named Collège Carnot in 1888 after president Lazare Carnot. In 1910 under principal Boinet, dormitories and an infirmary were added. When France entered World War II in 1939, the campus was requisitioned. During the occupation of France, classes took place at the former Maison Sauvager on Rue Grande while the original premises was used as a field hospital. Only external students were permitted during this time.

Preparatory classes were introduced in 1948. The multilingual école international de Fontainebleau was established in 1959 in an agreement between the Ministry of Education and SHAPE, who eventually left in 1967. The Anglophone Section was created in 1979, the high school of which is hosted at the lycée.

The school was renamed Lycée François 1er in King Francis I of France’s honour in 1960. In 2016, international was added to the title. Regional council president Valérie Pécresse brought the lycée as well as an elementary school (école élémentaire internationale Léonard-de-Vinci) and middle school (collège International) under the same international school banner, the campus international de Fontainebleau, so students could follow an international education throughout their schooling.

Notable people

Alumni
 Thad Carhart (born 1950) American writer
 Pierre Casiraghi (born 1987), member of the Monegasque Princely Family
 Antoine Frisch (born 1996), French and English rugby union player
 Paul Ji (born 2004), Chinese-American pianist
 Pascal Lecocq (born 1958), painter and set designer
 Enrico Macias (born 1938) Algerian-French singer, songwriter and musician
 Philippe Mahut (1956–2014), footballer
 Mark Maggiori (born 1977), French-American artist and member of the band Pleymo
 Roger Rabiniaux (1914-1986) writer and poet
 Marie Reno (born 1986), comedian and musician
 Pascal Thomas (born 1945), screenwriter and actor
 Luke Thompson (born 1988), English actor
 Laurent Tirard (born 1967), filmmaker

Faculty
 Joseph Zobel (1915–2006)

Partner schools
  Adam Mickiewicz High School Kraków VI
  Alexander-von-Humboldt-Gymnasium, Konstanz
  Charter School of Wilmington
  Franska Skolan
  North London Collegiate School
  St Philip's College

References

External links
 Main website
 Anglophone Section website

Lycées in Seine-et-Marne